Paul Eugene Jappe (January 16, 1898 - April 1, 1989) was an American football player who played four seasons in the National Football League with the New York Giants and Brooklyn Lions. He played college football at Syracuse University and attended Commercial High School in Brooklyn, New York. He was a member of the New York Giants team that won the 1927 NFL Championship. Jappe and high school teammate, Jim Frugone, played together at Syracuse, and also on the 1925 New York Giants.

References

External links
Just Sports Stats

1898 births
1989 deaths
Players of American football from New Jersey
American football ends
American football guards
American football tackles
Syracuse Orange football players
New York Giants players
Brooklyn Lions players
Sportspeople from Union City, New Jersey
People from Union City, New Jersey